Harry Andrew Ascroft (born 1 July 1995) is an Australian professional footballer who plays as a centre back or central midfielder for Dandenong Thunder in the National Premier Leagues.

Ascroft was born in Sydney, and played youth football with Bankstown City FC before starting his senior career with Sydney University. In 2013, he moved to the Netherlands to play for VVV-Venlo in the Eerste Divisie and later moved back to Australia to play for Central Coast Mariners in 2015.

He has represented Australia at under-20 level.

Club career
In late 2013, aged 18, Ascroft signed with Dutch Eerste Divisie side VVV-Venlo. He was released by VVV along with fellow Australian Travis Cooper in early 2015 due to the club's financial difficulties

On 29 July 2015, Ascroft was signed by Central Coast Mariners on a three-year deal. Ascroft made his Mariners debut against the Perth Glory as the Mariners stole three points in the 3–2 win. He netted his maiden A-League goal as the Mariners were plundered 4–1 by Sydney FC in Round 12.

On 18 January 2018, Ascroft was released by Central Coast Mariners to join Maltese club Balzan.

On 18 January 2019, Ascroft signed for League of Ireland side Finn Harps on a one-year deal, joining up with former Balzan team-mate Jacob Borg at the newly promoted Premier Division side.

International career
Ascroft was called up to the Australia U-20 team for the 2014 AFF U-19 Youth Championship. Ascroft made his debut for the side in the tournament's group stage, scoring a goal in a loss to Japan.

See also
 List of Central Coast Mariners FC players

References

External links

Living people
1995 births
Australian soccer players
Australia youth international soccer players
Australia under-20 international soccer players
Association football defenders
VVV-Venlo players
A-League Men players
Central Coast Mariners FC players
Balzan F.C. players
Eerste Divisie players
Finn Harps F.C. players
Dandenong Thunder SC players
Australian expatriate sportspeople in the Netherlands
Expatriate footballers in the Netherlands